McNamee-Ford House is a historic home located at Wabash, Wabash County, Indiana.  It was built in 1901, and is a two-story, Colonial Revival style frame dwelling with a two-story service wing.  It has a side-gable roof and is sheathed in clapboard siding.  The front facade features a central projecting pavilion, front porch supported by Ionic order columns, and second story tripartite window.

It was listed on the National Register of Historic Places in 1995.  It is located in the North Wabash Historic District.

References

Houses on the National Register of Historic Places in Indiana
Colonial Revival architecture in Indiana
Houses completed in 1901
Buildings and structures in Wabash County, Indiana
National Register of Historic Places in Wabash County, Indiana
Historic district contributing properties in Indiana
Wabash, Indiana